The 1952 Argentine Primera División was the 61st season of top-flight football in Argentina. The season began on April 6 and ended on November 29.

Rosario Central returned to Primera while Atlanta was relegated. River Plate won its 10th league title.

League standings

References

Argentine Primera División seasons
Argentine Primera Division
Primera Division